Penstemon bicolor is a species of penstemon known by the common name pinto beardtongue. It is native to the desert mountains and valleys of southern Nevada, eastern California, and western Arizona, where it grows in scrub, woodland, and other local habitat. It is a perennial herb which may exceed one meter in maximum height. The thick, serrated leaves are oppositely arranged and some pairs are fused around the stem at the bases. The inflorescence produces tubular flowers around 2 to nearly 3 centimeters long in many shades of yellow and pink, usually with striping in the throats. The flower's throat is hairy and the staminode just inside is coated in long yellowish hairs.

External links

bicolor
Flora of California
Flora of Nevada
Flora of Arizona
Flora of the United States
Flora without expected TNC conservation status